The Marlow Heights Shopping Center is an open-air shopping complex located in Marlow Heights, Maryland, on Branch Avenue (Maryland Route 5) at St. Barnabas Road (Maryland Route 414), and is positioned just south of Shops at Iverson.

History
At the time it opened it was the largest and most expensive shopping center in the Washington, D.C., area.

On August 29, 1960, Maryland Gov J. Millard Tawes opened the Hecht Company's new $4.5 million,  store. This was the fifth Hecht Company store to open in the Washington, D.C., area. Smaller shops included a Bond Stores outlet.

The Hot Shoppes restaurant at Marlow Heights was the final location in the chain to close (on December 2, 1999).

In early January 2021, it was announced that the Marlow Heights Macy's would be closing in Spring 2021.

Anchors and major retailers
Giant Food
Macy's - formerly Hecht Company (closed 2021)

References

External links 
 Marlow Heights 60s and 70s website, accessed Aug 27, 2008

Shopping malls in Maryland
Buildings and structures in Prince George's County, Maryland
Shopping malls established in 1957
1957 establishments in Maryland
Shopping malls in the Washington metropolitan area